Zhou Li (born June 1955) is a Chinese diplomat, member of National Committee of the Chinese People's Political Consultative Conference, served between 2013 and 2016 as the deputy head of the International Liaison Department of the Chinese Communist Party. Born in Anqiu, Shandong province, and has a master's degree in economics. He has been a lifelong diplomat, having served in the embassy to the Soviet Union (and later Russia), before returning to China in 1999 to serve as the deputy head of the department of European and Asian Affairs at the Ministry of Foreign Affairs. He returned to Russia in 2002.  He was promoted to European and Asian Affairs department chief in 2004, in 2006 he was posted to the Embassy of China, Kiev as ambassador in the Ukraine. He was transferred to Kazakhstan as ambassador in 2010.

He is married and has one son.

References

1955 births
Living people
Ambassadors of China to Ukraine
People from Weifang
Ambassadors of China to Kazakhstan